Makua may refer to:

 Makua (person), an alaafin of the Oyo Empire
 Makua people, an ethnic group in Mozambique and Tanzania
 Makhuwa language, a Bantu language spoken in Mozambique
 Makua languages, a branch of Bantu languages
 Makua Rothman (born 1984), American world champion surfer

See also
 Makuv'a language, a language of East Timor
 Macuá